Old Gate may refer to:
 Old Gate (Jerusalem), a gate in Jerusalem
 Old Gate (Speyer), a gate in Speyer, Germany